Coronet is a 131' wooden-hull schooner yacht built for oil tycoon Rufus T. Bush in 1885.  It is one of the oldest and largest vessels of its type in the world, and one of the last grand sailing yachts of the 19th century extant.  After numerous owners and decades of neglect, it underwent an extensive restoration at Newport, Rhode Island's, The International Yacht Restoration School beginning in 2010.

History
The  schooner Coronet was designed by William Townsend and built for Rufus T. Bush by the C. & R. Poillon shipyard in Brooklyn. Bush then put forth a $10,000 challenge against any other yacht for a transatlantic race.  The ocean race between Coronet and the Caldwell Hart Colt's yacht Dauntless in March 1887 made Bush and the victorious Coronet famous— The New York Times devoted its entire first page for March 28, 1887 to the story.

After winning the 3,000-mile race and the $10,000 purse, Bush decided to sell Coronet and listed the vessel in England for $30,000. Rufus and his son Irving T. Bush then circumnavigated the globe on Coronet in 1888.  Coronet was the first registered yacht to cross Cape Horn from East to West. After crossing the Pacific Ocean and stopping in Hawaii, Coronet made port in China, Calcutta, Malta and elsewhere.<ref>A timeline of the yacht's history is available in PDF format at Backgrounder: Coronet History and Milestones"]</ref>Coronet was sold before Rufus's death in 1890 The vessel then passed through six different owners (Arthur E. Bateman, John D. Wing, Arthur Curtiss James, Fred S. Pearson, John I. Waterbury, and Louis Bossert) by 1905. The Coronet circumnavigated the globe several times and was used for a Japanese-American scientific excursion during an eclipse.

The Kingdom, a religious organization founded by Frank Sandford, purchased the ship in 1905 for $10,000 and took it around the world on prayer missions, including to Palestine.  Coronet took a poorly planned missionary voyage to Africa in 1911 which resulted in six persons on board dying of scurvy.  After the voyage, The Kingdom kept the yacht moored at Portland, Maine as well as Gloucester, Massachusetts and owned her until 1995.

Restoration
The International Yacht Restoration School, in Newport, Rhode Island acquired the vessel in 1995 and began its restoration.  IYRS added Coronet'' to the National Register of Historic Places in 2004. In December 2006, IYRS conveyed title of the boat to the [https://web.archive.org/web/20121105192240/http://coronet-restorations.com/ Coronet Restoration Partners in San Francisco to complete the restoration on IYRS's campus in Rhode Island, where restoration works started in 2010.

Coronet Gallery

See also 
 List of oldest surviving ships
 List of schooners
 National Register of Historic Places listings in Newport County, Rhode Island

References

External links

Coronet's History with "The Kingdom"

Page that details Coronet's ongoing restoration

Museum ships in Rhode Island
Ships built in Brooklyn
Schooners of the United States
Individual sailing vessels
Museums in Newport, Rhode Island
Historic American Engineering Record in Rhode Island
National Register of Historic Places in Newport, Rhode Island
Ships on the National Register of Historic Places in Rhode Island
1885 ships
Former yachts of New York City